Grupo Bryndis is a Mexican Grupera band from Cerritos, San Luis Potosí, - though founded in Santa Paula, California in 1983 by Mauro Posadas, the band is a Latin Grammy Award winner. The band performs in the balada tecnocumbia, grupera genres.

Members
The Grupo Bryndis band members are: Mauro Posadas, songwriter and leader (guitar); Gerardo Izaguirre (bass guitar); Claudio Montano (keyboards); Mauro Posadas Jr. (drums); Andy Zuniga (percussion and lead singer). In March 2010, vocalist Guadalupe Guevara and drummer Juan Guevara left the group due to disagreements with the other band members. In April 2010, the band welcomed back their original lead vocalist Tony Solís. The band also welcomed Mauro Posadas Jr. on drums. In February 2012, the band welcomed Andy Zuniga on electric percussions and backing vocals. Tony Solís and Freddy Solís left the group around the end of 2012. Since late 2013, Zuniga has been the lead vocalist for the group.

Discography

Albums
 Alma Vacía (1986) - with Tony Solís
 Atrás De Mí Ventana (1987)
 Hola (1988) - last album with Tony Solís for 22 years
 Me Vas a Extrañar (1989) - first album on Fonodiaz and with Guadalupe Guevara
 Me Haces Falta (1990)
 Aún Te Amo (1991) - last album on Fonodiaz
 15 Hits Romance Sin Límite (1992) - first album on Disa
 A Su Salud (1992)
 Por El Amor (1993) - gold status in 1994.
 Poemas (1994)
 Tu Amor Secreto  (1995)
 Mi Verdadero Amor  (1996)
 Poemas, Vol. 2 (1996)
 Así Es El Amor  (1997)
 Un Juego de Amor (1998)
 Por el Pasado (2000)
 En El Idioma del Amor (2001)
 Nuestros Éxitos con Trío (2002)
 Memorias (2003)
 El Quinto Trago (2004)
 En Vivo Gira México 2005 (2005)
 Por Muchas Razones Te Quiero (2005)
 Recordándote (2006)
 20 Reales Super Éxitos (2006})
 Más Que Románticos (2006)
 15 Inolvidables de Siempre (2007)
 15 Grandes: El Inicio de una Historia (2007)
 Solo Pienso En Ti (2007) - last album on Disa - Latin Grammy Award winner 
 La Magía de Tu Amor (2008) - first album on EMI and last album with Guadalupe Guevara
 Más Allá del Tiempo y La Distancia (2010) - with the return of original vocalist Tony Solís
 Huele a Peligro (2012) - last album with Tony Solís 
 Adicto a Ti (2014) - first album on Fonovisa and with Andy Zuniga
 A Nuestro Estilo (2016)
 30 Años Cantandole Al Amor (2018)
 La Historia de Los Exitos (2021)

Selected singles
Charting singles include "Te Vas Con El," "La Última Canción," "Otro Ocupa Mi Lugar," "El Quinto Trago," "Atrás de Mi Ventana," "Te Esperaré," "Quizás Sí, Quizás No," "La Chica del Este," "Perdóname," "Entre Tú y Yo," "Secreto Amor," "Vas a Sufrir" and "La Chica del Este."

References

Mexican musical groups
Latin Grammy Award winners
Musical groups from Ventura County, California
Capitol Latin artists
1983 establishments in California
People from Santa Paula, California
Grupera music groups